The Golden Mile is a name given to Belgrave Road in Leicester, England. The origin of the name is often mistakenly attributed to the plethora of shops selling Indian gold jewelry. In actual fact, the name originates from the late 1960s and early 1970s when a rapid succession of yellow-amber traffic lights began to appear along Belgrave Road.
The Golden Mile is renowned for its authentic Indian restaurants, sari shops and jewellers and has been described as "the closest that Britain comes to an Indian bazaar.” This area of the city is also famous for its seasonal lights which combine to celebrate winter festivals including Diwali and Christmas. The Diwali celebrations in Leicester are focused on this area and are the largest outside India. Filming of Jadoo took place on the Golden Mile.

References

External links
Visit Leicester - Golden Mile

Story of Leicester - The Golden Mile

Leicester’s Golden Mile

Golden Mile - Leicester Mercury

Trip Advisor - The Golden Mile

The Golden Mile - Lonely Planet

A delicious stroll along The Golden Mile - Great Food Club

Saris and jewellery to spices and dining on the Golden Mile - Visit England

Leicester
Roads in Leicester
Areas of Leicester
Tourist attractions in Leicestershire
Culture in Leicestershire